Toroidion was a Finnish car manufacturer domiciled in Pohja, Raseborg. On March 3, 2022, the company filed for bankruptcy.

1MW Concept

In 2015 Toroidion introduced a concept car:  the electric supercar 1MW Concept. Toroidion Ltd claimed to have solved core problems that have prevented making electric cars practical, but evidence of this claim has not emerged. A utility model details a central stator divided in multiple sections, each of which is fed three-phase current with a separate frequency converter. This enables a lower voltage at higher power. More elements can be added to the engine in axial direction, so that an engine can have 20 or more frequency converters. Toroidion has claimed that the lower operating voltage makes an electric car safer. 
Racing driver Mika Salo joined Toroidion's R&D team in 2016. Toroidion was aiming in 2016 at participation in the 24 Hours of Le Mans race within a few years.

The 1MW produces . Each wheel is powered by its own motor. The front wheels each have  motors and the rear wheels each have  motors. The car is capable of accelerating from 0 to 400 km/h (249 mph) in 11 seconds. The battery of the car is of rapid-swap and high-capacity type.

Production
On January 8, 2019, it was reported that production of Toroidion was starting, cars are to be made upon order and that maximum production capacity is 75. The model was named as the EUSSTA M1.

Bankruptcy
Toroidion filed for bankruptcy on March 3, 2022. According to the company management, they ran out of money.
The company never showed a finished vehicle or sold one.

References

External links
 
 BBC.com: From Finland, the 1,341-horsepower electric supercar
 CNN Money
 Finska Muskler 2016 Toroidion 1MW Concept

Electric concept cars
Organisations based in Raseborg
Car manufacturers of Finland